Erpobdella lineata is a leech found in Europe. These leeches show a preference for calcic waters and have a tolerance to pollution. They have a digestive tract that consists of mouth, pharynx, esophagus, six-chambered stomach, three-chambered intestine, rectum, and an anus. Its nervous system contains 21 pairs of cell compartments.

See also
 List of leeches of the Czech Republic

References

Leeches
Animals described in 1774
Taxa named by Otto Friedrich Müller